Statistics of the Primera División de México for the 1979–80 season.

Overview

Atlas was promoted to Primera División.

This season was contested by 20 teams, and Cruz Azul won the championship.

Jalisco was relegated to Segunda División.

Teams

Group stage

Group 1

Group 2

Group 3

Group 4

Results

Relegation playoff

Unión de Curtidores won 4-3 on aggregate. Jalisco was relegated to Segunda División.

Playoff

Semifinal

Group 1

Group A Results

Round 1América 1 - 2 U.A.N.L.U.N.A.M. 0 - 0 Zacatepec

Round 2América 2 - 0 ZacatepecU.A.N.L. 0 - 1 U.N.A.M.

Round 3U.N.A.M. 0 - 1 AméricaZacatepec 1 - 1 U.A.N.L.

Round 4Zacatepec 0 - 0 U.N.A.M.U.A.N.L. 0 - 0 América

Round 5Zacatepec 3 - 2 AméricaU.N.A.M. 2 - 2 U.A.N.L.

Round 6América 0 - 0 U.N.A.M.U.A.N.L. 4 - 1 Zacatepec

Group B

Group B Results

Round 1Tampico Madero 0 - 1 Cruz AzulNeza 1 – 0 Atlante

Round 2Cruz Azul 4 - 2 AtlanteNeza 1 - 1 Tampico Madero

Round 3Neza 0 - 2 Cruz AzulAtlante 5 - 2 Tampico

Round 4Cruz Azul 0 - 1 Tampico MaderoAtlante 1 – 1 Neza

Round 5Cruz Azul 1 - 0 NezaTampico Madero 1 - 1 Atlante

Round 6Tampico Madero 1 - 2 NezaAtlante 3 - 1 Cruz Azul

Final

Cruz Azul won 4-3 on aggregate.

References
Mexico - List of final tables (RSSSF)

Liga MX seasons
Mex
1979–80 in Mexican football